Chris Baumann (born 18 May 1987) is an American rugby union player who currently plays for the San Diego Legion of Major League Rugby (MLR) as a tighthead prop.

Baumann was named in United States squad for the 2015 Rugby World Cup, and played six times for Leicester Tigers in the 2017–18 season. He plays as a tighthead prop, but is also capable of playing at hooker.

References

External links 
 Chris Baumann Profile, USA Rugby Eagle
https://www.barstoolsports.com/chicks/smokebro-of-the-day-chris-baumann-of-usa-rugby Barstool Sports
https://www.nytimes.com/2016/10/08/sports/coloradan-finds-home-where-rugby-sport-is-king.html The New York Times

1987 births
Living people
American rugby union players
United States international rugby union players
People from Steamboat Springs, Colorado
Rugby union props
Denver Stampede players
Wellington rugby union players
Leicester Tigers players
San Diego Legion players